During the 1995–96 English football season, Chelsea competed in the Premier League.

Season summary
The big news at Chelsea at the start of the 1995–96 season was the arrival of Manchester United striker Mark Hughes, one of the most accomplished strikers of the last decade in the English leagues, and the arrival of Dutch superstar Ruud Gullit.

Chelsea had a mid-table Premiership campaign in 1995–96, finishing 11th for the third time in four seasons, but once again they enjoyed a good cup run. This time they reached the FA Cup semi-finals, taking on Manchester United, who had beaten them in the final two years earlier. Chelsea took an early lead, but lost 2–1 and with it went their hopes of a foray into Europe. A few weeks later, Chelsea manager Glenn Hoddle's decision to quit for the England manager's job was understandable as a job he could not turn down. They responded by appointing Ruud Gullit as player-manager. Gullit wasted no time in preparing Chelsea for the following season, breaking the club record in a £4.9 million move for Italian midfielder Roberto Di Matteo from Lazio.

Statistics

|}

Results

Premier League

League Cup

FA Cup

References

Chelsea 1995/1996 results and fixtures  at Soccerbase.com

Chelsea F.C. seasons
Chelsea